Chintha Lakshmi Sinhaarachchi was a Sri Lankan writer who is best known for her translation of Bengali novels to Sinhalese.

Works

Translations
 Mawathe Geethaya (Sinhala මාව‍තේ ගීතය) Sinhala translation of Pather Panchali 
 Aparajitha Jeewithayak (Sinhala අපරාජිත ජීවිතයක්) 
 Apuge Lokaya (Sinhala අපූගේ ලෝකය) 
 Binduge Daruwa (Sinhala බිංදුගේ දරුවා) 
 Isiwaraya (Sinhala ඉසිවරයා)
 Shri Kaantha (Sinhala ශ්‍රී කාන්ත) 
 Shri Kantha Ha Raja Lakshmi (Sinhala ශ්‍රී කාන්ත හා රාජලක්‍ෂ්මී) 
 Aranakata Pem Banda (Sinhala අරණකට පෙම් බැඳ)
 Gora (Sinhala ගෝරා) 
 Go Danaya (Sinhala ගෝදානය)

Other works
Rabindranaatha Takur Saha Bauddha Sanskruthiya (Sinhala රබීන්ද්‍රනාථ ඨාකූර් සහ බෞද්ධ සංස්කෘතිය)

References

Sinhalese writers
Sri Lankan translators
20th-century Sri Lankan writers
20th-century Sri Lankan women writers
Year of birth missing (living people)
Living people